Year 101 (CI) was a common year starting on Friday (link will display the full calendar) of the Julian calendar. At the time, it was known as the Year of the Consulship of Traianus and Paetus (or, less frequently, year 854 Ab urbe condita). The denomination 101 for this year has been used since the early medieval period, when the Anno Domini calendar era became the prevalent method in Europe for naming years.

Events

By place

Roman Empire 
 Emperor Trajan starts an expedition against Dacia, exceeding the limits of the Roman Empire set by Augustus.
 Second Battle of Tapae: Roman forces, led by Trajan, defeat the Dacian king Decebalus in Transylvania.

By topic

Literature 
 Epictetus writes and publishes The Discourses of Epictetus (approximate date).

Births 
 January 13 – Lucius Aelius Caesar, Roman politician (d. 138)
 Felicitas of Rome, Christian female martyr (d. 165)
 Herodes Atticus, Greek rhetoritician (d. 177)

Deaths 
 Clement I, bishop of Rome (epistle to the Corinthians) (or 102 according to Roman Catholic tradition)
 Gan Ying, Chinese ambassador of the Han Dynasty 
 Jia Kui, Chinese scholar and philosopher (b. AD 30)
 Silius Italicus, Roman politician and author of the Punica (annals of Hannibal during the Second Punic War) (b. c. AD 28)

References